This is a list of all auctions and personnel signings for the 2022–23 SA20 Cricket Tournament.

Team auction
Cricket South Africa held an auction for six team franchises. The exact price of the franchises has not been publicly declared, but all franchisees were sold to Indian corporations. All corporations also operate an IPL franchise.

Player auction

Over 500 players registered their interest to participate in the league, however, the list was cut down to 318 after all teams submitted their shortlist.  

Since this was the first edition of the tournament, there were no retentions or transfers.

Base prices were set as follows:

 Star Overseas players: 
 Proteas players: 
 other South African players: 

Each team could only have a maximum of 17 players in their squad and was allowed a maximum of seven overseas players. The auction was held on 19 September 2022 at the Cape Town International Convention Centre in Cape Town, South Africa.

Pre-auction picks
Teams were given an option to pick up to five players in a pre-auction.

Auction results

Wildcard picks
In November 2022, the SA20 allowed all six teams to sign an additional player as a wildcard. Teams were given under 31 December 2022 to pick either a South African or Overseas player. The following were the wildcard picks:

 Durban Super Giants: Akila Dananjaya
 Joburg Super Kings: Aaron Phangiso
 MI Cape Town: Jofra Archer
 Paarl Royals: Andile Phehlukwayo
 Pretoria Capitals: Senuran Muthusamy
 Sunrisers Eastern Cape: Jordan Hermann

Mid-Season Signings 
The following players were signed by teams after the first game on 10 January 2023:

 Temba Bavuma joined the Sunrisers Eastern Cape and replaced Tom Abell on 2 February 2023.

References

External links

 ESPNcricinfo- SA20, 2022/23-Squads

2022 in South Africa
Domestic cricket competitions in 2022–23
SA20